Gautam Buddha International Cricket Stadium, often abbreviated as GBICS, is a cricket stadium being built at Bharatpur, Nepal. , 15% of the overall work has been completed.

History 
The campaign for the stadium was started by the Dhurmus-Suntali Foundation. The stadium gets its name from the nearby situated site of Lumbini where Buddha was born. Construction is scheduled to be completed by 2021. The 3D design of the stadium has been completed. The entrance of the stadium resembles traditional Nepalese architecture. The stadium also have two grounds for practice on its outskirts.

The land for the construction has been provided by the Government of Nepal through Bharatpur Metropolitan City. The co-founder of the Dhurmus-Suntali foundation Sitaram Kattel says that the stadium will be funded by generous donors from all around the world. He hopes that if the donations are not sufficient then the Government will provide funds to finish the project.

See also 
 List of cricket grounds in Nepal

References

External links 
 
 

Cricket grounds in Nepal
Sports venues in Nepal
Buildings and structures in Bharatpur, Nepal